Al-Bakbuk is an impact crater in the northern hemisphere of Saturn's moon Enceladus. Al-Bakbuk was first observed in Cassini images during that mission's March 2005 flyby of Enceladus. Since the crater's formation, numerous north–south trending fractures cut across the crater, forming canyons several hundred meters deep along the crater's rim.

Al-Bakbuk is named after one of the barber's six brothers in "The Hunchback's Tale" in The Book of One Thousand and One Nights.

References

Impact craters on Enceladus